Alvin Deutsch (February 9, 1932 - October 6, 2021) was a copyright attorney known for his work with Peggy Lee, Scott Rudin and the estate of Harper Lee.

His work as legal counsel for Goodspeed Opera House allowed the theater to establish a new model of revenue stemming from original productions, which changed the landscape for non-profit theatres.

Deutsch married Davida Miriam Tenenbaum in May 1967. He was an alumnus of Johns Hopkins University and Yale Law School. He co-founded Linden and Deutsch and later became partner at McLaughlin & Stern. He was an adjunct professor specializing in copyright at Cardozo Law School.  He served as Parnas at Congregation Shearith Israel in Manhattan.

References

1932 births
2021 deaths
20th-century American lawyers